Global Health Action is a peer-reviewed open access journal publishing research on global health. Global Health Action is published by Taylor & Francis in partnership and a 50/50 ownership agreement with Umeå University, Sweden. 

According to the Journal Citation Reports, the journal had a 2021 impact factor of 2.996.

References

External links 
 
 Global Health Action at 15 – revisiting its rationale

Globalization-related journals
Creative Commons Attribution-licensed journals
Public health journals
Umeå University
Publications established in 2008
English-language journals